Podocarpus pallidus is a species of conifer in the family Podocarpaceae. It is found only in, and so is endemic to Tonga in the South Pacific.

References

pallidus
Endemic flora of Tonga
Taxonomy articles created by Polbot
Plants described in 1959